PT Bank Mandiri (Persero) Tbk or Bank Mandiri, headquartered in Jakarta, is the largest bank in Indonesia in terms of assets, loans and deposits. Total assets as of March 2021, were IDR 1.58 quadrillion (around US$110.56 billion). As of March 2021, Bank Mandiri was the largest bank in Indonesia by total assets.

As of December 2020, the bank had 2,511 branches spread across three different time zones in Indonesia and 7 branches abroad, about 13,217 Automatic Teller Machines (ATMs), and five principal subsidiaries: Mandiri Sekuritas, Mandiri Tunas Finance, AXA Mandiri Financial Services, Bank Mandiri Taspen, and Mandiri AXA General Insurance.

History

Pre-merger

Bank Mandiri is the result of the merger made by Indonesian government from four older government-owned banks that failed in 1998. Those four banks were Bank Bumi Daya, Bank Dagang Negara, Bank Ekspor Impor Indonesia, and Bank Pembangunan Indonesia. During the amalgamation and reorganisation, the government reduced the number of branches by 194 and the number of personnel from 26,600 to 17,620.

Bank Bumi Daya and Bank Ekspor Impor Indonesia was previously merged in 1965 by the Indonesian government under Guided Democracy into Bank Negara Indonesia (BNI) umbrella, 1968: The Indonesian government then reorganized the banks in 1968 as the New Order government took place.

 Bank Bumi Daya (BBD) started in 1959, when the government nationalized Nationale Handelsbank's operations in Indonesia as a part of boycott on Dutch companies amid both nation's dispute over Western New Guinea, and from them the government created Bank Umum Negara ("State General Bank"). In 1964, the government nationalized Chartered Bank's operations in Indonesia and merged them into Bank Umum Negara; the British overseas bank had first entered Indonesia in 1863 when it opened an agency in Batavia (now Jakarta). In 1965 the government brought Bank Umum Negara into BNI, renaming it Bank Negara Indonesia Unit IV (BNI IV), but in 1968 BNI IV became an independent bank again with the name Bank Bumi Daya.
 Bank Ekspor Impor Indonesia (BankExim, "Export Import Bank of Indonesia") was created in 1960 as the Indonesian government nationalized the Indonesian operations of Nederlandsche Handel-Maatschappij. The bank then merged into BNI by the government in 1965 and became Bank Negara Indonesia Unit II (BNI II). In 1968, the government split BNI II into two parts, with the BNI Unit II Export-Import Division becoming BankExim, which specialised in trade finance.
 Bank Dagang Negara (BDN, "State Trading Bank") was established in 1960 from the nationalization of Escomptobank. Escomptobank NV, previously Nederlandsch Indische Escompto Maatschappij until 1949, was established in Batavia in 1857.
 Bank Pembangunan Indonesia (Bapindo, "Development Bank of Indonesia") had its root from Bank Industri Negara (BIN, "State Industrial Bank"), which was established in 1951. The bank was aimed to finance priority sectors, such as plantations, industry and mining. In 1960, the Indonesian government established Bapindo and merged BIN into it. Bapindo specialised in medium and long-term financing of manufacturing, tourism and transportation. In 1986, Bapindo expanded into general commercial banking.

Merger and later history
In 1998, the government merged BBD, BDN, BankExim and Bapindo to create Bank Mandiri to restructurize some state-owned banks to manage impacts of financial crisis at the time. Bank Mandiri was established on 2 October 1998, and the merged banks operated effectively as a single bank starting on 31 July 1999. The name Mandiri (Indonesian for "self-reliant" or "independent") was coined by President B. J. Habibie during his presidency, with the hope that the bank could become a self-reliant bank and encourage the people, especially who need microfinancing, to also become self-reliant.

In 2004, the bank opened a branch in Dili, East Timor and a representative office in Shanghai, China.

Board of directors
President Director : Darmawan Junaidi
Vice-president Director : Alexandra Askandar
Director Manajemen Risiko : Ahmad Siddik Badruddin
Director Kepatuhan dan SDM : Agus Dwi Handaya
Director Treasury & International Banking: Eka Fitria
Director Commercial Banking : Riduan
Director Jaringan & Retail Banking : Aquarius Radianto
Director Operation : Toni E.B. Subari
Director Corporate Banking : Susana Indah Kris Indriati
Director Hubungan Kelembagaan : Rohan Hafas
Director Keuangan dan Strategi : Sigit Prastowo
Director Information Technology : Timothy Utama

Products

Consumer banking
 Mandiri Savings:
 Mandiri Saving Account
 Mandiri Business Saving
 Mandiri Plan Saving
 Mandiri Hajj Saving
 Mandiri Foreign Currency Saving
 Mandiri Current account
 Mandiri Current Account
 Mandiri Deposit
 Mandiri Deposit
 Mandiri Foreign Currency Deposit
 Mandiri Debit
 Mandiri Debit
 Mandiri Prepaid
 GazCard
 Indomaret Card
 E-toll Card
 Mandiri credit card
 Mandiri Visa
 Mandiri Mastercard
 Mandiri JCB
 Mandiri consumer loan
 Mandiri KPR
 Mandiri KPR Multiguna
 Mandiri personal loan
 Mandiri Mitrakarya
 Mandiri Tunas KPM
 Mandiri Priority Services
 Mandiri Priority Services
 Merchant Relations Program
 Investment Products
 Mutual funds
 ORI & Sukuk Ritel
 Bancassurance
 Mandiri Investasi Sejahtera
 Mandiri Jiwa Sejahtera
 Mandiri Rencana Sejahtera
 Retail Brokerage Service
 Retail Brokerage
 Consumer Banking Treasury (CBT)
 Consumer Banking Treasury

Subsidiaries

International
 Bank Mandiri Singapore Branch, operate under wholesale bank licence granted by Monetary Authority of Singapore
 Bank Mandiri Hong Kong Branch
 Bank Mandiri Cayman Islands Branch
 Bank Mandiri Dili Branch
 Bank Mandiri Shanghai Branch
 Bank Mandiri (Europe) Limited, located in London, UK. Subsidiary of PT Bank Mandiri (Persero) Tbk.

Principal
 Mandiri Sekuritas, at Capital Market Awards 2011, PT Mandiri Sekuritas got 3 awards from 9 awards (Marketing Net, the Best Bond Emiten, and the Best Stock Exchange member)
 AXA Mandiri Financial Services
 Bank Sinar Harapan Bali (BSHB) (now Bank Mandiri Taspen or Bank Mantap)
 Mandiri Tunas Finance
 Mandiri Utama Finance
 Mandiri AXA General Insurance
 Asuransi Jiwa InHealth Indonesia (now Mandiri InHealth)

Awards
Based on mystery shopper method done by surveyor, in 2011 Bank Mandiri got average value 91.23 percent, a first time for a bank got more than 90 percent over 15 years survey. Bank Mandiri got Service Excellence Award for 4 times consecutives and got The Most Consistent Bank for 2 times.

Slogans
 1998–2005: Bank Terpercaya Pilihan Anda (The Trust and Preferred Bank)
 2003–2005: Satu Hati, Satu Negeri, Satu Bank (One Heart, One Country, One Bank)
 2005–2008: Melayani Dengan Hati, Menuju yang Terbaik (Serve With Heart, Towards the Best)
 2008–present: Terdepan, Terpercaya, Tumbuh Bersama Anda (Leading, Trust, Enabling Growth)
 2009–2010: Menembus Batas Keinginan (Breaking the Limits of Desire)
 2010–2012: Menjawab Setiap Keinginan (Answering Every Wish)
 2012–2018: Apapun Keinginan Anda, Mandiri Saja (Whatever You Want, Choose Mandiri)
 2018–present: Saatnya Mandiri (Time For Mandiri)

See also

 Jakarta Marathon, sponsored by Mandiri bank

References

External links

 Official website
 Official website 
 Bank Mandiri's Financial Report
 Bank Mandiri Singapore Branch
 Bank Mandiri Hong Kong Branch
 Bank Mandiri (Europe) Limited
 Kode Bank Mandiri

1998 establishments in Indonesia
2003 initial public offerings
 
Banks of Indonesia
Companies based in Jakarta
Government-owned banks of Indonesia
Indonesian brands
Companies listed on the Indonesia Stock Exchange
Banks established in 1998
Indonesian companies established in 1998